Central School Historic District is a national historic district located at Kings Mountain, Cleveland County, North Carolina.  It encompasses 52 contributing buildings and 4 contributing structures in a residential section of Kings Mountain.  The houses date between about 1870 and 1950, and include representative examples of the Second Empire and Queen Anne architectural styles.  Notable nonresidential buildings are the Second Southern Railway Depot (1925), St. Matthew's Lutheran Church (1921, 1950), First Presbyterian Church (1936), and Central·High School (1933).

It was listed on the National Register of Historic Places in 2001.

References

Historic districts on the National Register of Historic Places in North Carolina
Kings Mountain, North Carolina
Second Empire architecture in North Carolina
Queen Anne architecture in North Carolina
Buildings and structures in Cleveland County, North Carolina
National Register of Historic Places in Cleveland County, North Carolina